Charles Jacob Stine (19 August 1864 – 5 January 1934) was an American silent film actor.

Charles J. Stine was born on 19 August 1864 in Freeport, Illinois.

After a long stage career starting in 1878, Stine began acting with Essanay Studios in Chicago in 1913. The short films in which he appeared include The Fable of the Roistering Blades (1915) written by George Ade and starring Wallace Beery.

Stine died on 5 January 1934 in Bay Shore, Long Island, New York.

Partial filmography
The Ups and Downs (1914) with Wallace Beery
His New Job (1915) with Charles Chaplin and Gloria Swanson (uncredited)
The Fable of the Roistering Blades (1915) with Wallace Beery
Captain Jinks of the Horse Marines (1916)
The Misleading Lady (1916)

References

External links
 

1864 births
1934 deaths
American male silent film actors
People from Freeport, Illinois
19th-century American male actors
20th-century American male actors
American male stage actors
Male actors from Illinois